Richard James Clausen (born June 29, 1982) is the current offensive coordinator/quarterbacks coach at Bishop Alemany High School. He is also a former American football player who played college football for Louisiana State University and University of Tennessee.

College career
Clausen initially started his college football career at LSU under then-head coach Nick Saban. In 2001, he redshirted as Rohan Davey was the established starter. In 2002, he played in three games, starting the 2002 game against Ole Miss. At the end of the 2002 season, he transferred to Tennessee, where he walked on to the football team as a backup quarterback, sitting out the 2003 season under the NCAA transfer rules. In the 2004 season under head coach Phillip Fulmer, he shared the quarterback job with Erik Ainge and Brent Schaeffer. He was 81 of 136 for 949 passing yards, eight touchdowns, and five interceptions. In the 2005 season, he and Ainge continued to share time. He was 120 of 209 for 1,441 passing yards, six touchdowns, and six interceptions. Clausen went undrafted in the 2005 NFL Draft.

Personal life
His older brother, Casey, also played college football for Tennessee in 2000-2003 and is the head football coach at Bishop Alemany High School. His youngest brother, Jimmy, formerly played quarterback for the Baltimore Ravens of the NFL.

References

1982 births
Living people
American football quarterbacks
LSU Tigers football players
Tennessee Volunteers football players
High school football coaches in California
People from Thousand Oaks, California
People from Woodland Hills, Los Angeles
Sportspeople from Ventura County, California
Players of American football from California